Pedro Eliezer Rodríguez Ledesma (born 28 July 1987), known as Pedro, is a Spanish professional footballer who plays as a forward or winger for Serie A club Lazio.

Pedro scored 99 goals in 321 appearances across all competitions for Barcelona from 2008 to 2015. During the 2009–10 season, he became the first player in history to score in every official club competition in a single season and in a single calendar year. He joined Chelsea in 2015 where he scored 43 goals in 206 appearances and helped the club win the Premier League in 2017, the FA Cup in 2018 and the UEFA Europa League in 2019. He joined Serie A club Roma in 2020 and moved to their city rivals Lazio in 2021.

Pedro represented Spain in two FIFA World Cups and two UEFA European Championships, winning the former in 2010 and the latter in 2012.

Club career

Early career
Born in Santa Cruz de Tenerife, Tenerife, Pedro started his career at local club San Isidro. He scored 35 goals for their youth team in the 2003–04 season, and also played for the first team in the Tercera División. In August 2004, he joined Barcelona's youth team.

Pedro was a key player for Barcelona B as the team achieved promotion in the 2007–08 Tercera División, making 36 appearances and scoring six goals. On 12 January 2008, he made his debut for the first team, playing one minute in a 4–0 home win against Real Murcia in the 2007–08 La Liga, but would only amass four more minutes in his only two appearances combined.

Barcelona

2008–2010: Development and breakthrough

Pedro was a part of the first team's 2008–09 pre-season, and showed early promise, scoring against Hibernian and the New York Red Bulls respectively. On 13 August 2008, he started in a 4–0 win against Wisła Kraków in the third qualifying round of the 2008–09 UEFA Champions League. His first appearance in the group stage of that competition came on 16 September, when he replaced Thierry Henry in a 3–1 home win over Sporting CP. In Barcelona's treble-winning season in 2008–09, Pedro made 14 appearances. In the Champions League final, he came on as a stoppage-time substitute in a 2–0 win against Manchester United at the Stadio Olimpico in Rome.

In the 2009–10 season, Pedro became the first player to score in every official club competition in a single season and also in a calendar year. On 16 August, after assisting Xavi with the first goal, he scored his first competitive goal for the first team in the 67th minute, helping to ensure a 2–1 victory over Athletic Bilbao in San Mamés for the 2009 Supercopa de España. Later that week, he signed his first professional contract with Barcelona. In the 2009 UEFA Super Cup against Shakhtar Donetsk, he came on as a substitute for Zlatan Ibrahimović in the 80th minute, and went on to score the only goal of the match in extra time. On 28 September, Pedro scored his first goal in the Champions League, after replacing Iniesta at half-time in a 2–0 win against Dynamo Kyiv.

On 16 December, Pedro scored a goal in the semi-final of the 2009 FIFA Club World Cup against Atlante, in a 3–1 win. In doing so, he became the first player ever to score in six different club competitions in a single season and in a single year – the three domestic competitions, the UEFA Champions League, UEFA Super Cup and the FIFA Club World Cup. Pedro scored for Barcelona in each of the last three league matches of the season, with the team eventually renewing their league supremacy: against Tenerife (4–1 win), the 3–2 winner at Sevilla and against Valladolid (4–0). He completed the 2009–10 season with 52 appearances in all competitions and 23 goals, and, on 9 June 2010, signed a new five-year contract with Barcelona.

2010–11: UEFA Champions League and La Liga success

Pedro began the 2010–11 season firmly established in Barcelona's starting line-up. On 29 November 2010, he scored the second goal in the a 5–0 home win against Real Madrid, with Barcelona climbing to the first place in the league as a result. The following month, he scored twice against Espanyol in the local derby, in a 5–1 away win.

On 20 April 2011, Pedro scored against Real Madrid in the second half of 2011 Copa del Rey final, but his goal was disallowed for offside, in an eventual 1–0 extra-time loss. On 3 May, against the same opponent, in the 2010–11 Champions League semi-final second leg, he found Iker Casillas' net in a 1–1 home draw (3–1 aggregate win). In the Champions League final, he opened the scoring against Manchester United, in a 3–1 win at Wembley Stadium in London.

2011–2014: Further La Liga and domestic success
On 5 July 2011, Pedro extended his contract by one year, until June 2016. His buyout clause was raised from €90 million to €150 million. After the signing of Alexis Sánchez, Pedro featured less during the 2011–12 season. However, he did finish the season with 13 goals, including two in that season's Copa del Rey final, a 3–0 win against Athletic Bilbao.

On 21 September 2013, Pedro scored a hat-trick in a 4–0 victory away to Rayo Vallecano. On 22 December, in another away fixture, he added another three – all in the first half and in only nine minutes – to help Barcelona come back from 2–0 down to win 5–2 over Getafe, thus becoming the player to score the fastest ever hat-trick in Barcelona history.

2014–15: Treble and final season

On 16 December 2014, Pedro scored another hat-trick, this time in a round of 32 second leg fixture in the Copa del Rey against Huesca, with Barcelona winning 8–1 at home. On 4 June 2015, Barcelona announced that Pedro had signed a new four-year contract, and that his buyout clause would remain at €150 million.

On 6 June 2015, Pedro appeared as a stoppage-time substitute in the Champions League final, as the club won its fifth  title by beating Juventus 3–1 at Berlin's Olympiastadion. This made Barcelona the first club in history to win the treble of domestic league, domestic cup and European Cup twice. Pedro, Lionel Messi, Andrés Iniesta, Xavi, Gerard Piqué, Sergio Busquets and Dani Alves were the only players to have been a part of both treble-winning teams.

As an extra-time substitute, Pedro scored the winning goal as Barcelona won the 2015 UEFA Super Cup 5–4 against Sevilla on 11 August in Tbilisi.

Chelsea

2015–2017: Debut season and Premier League title

On 20 August 2015, Pedro signed for Premier League champions Chelsea on a four-year contract for £19 million (€26.6 million), potentially rising to £21.4 million (€30 million) in add-ons. Three days after signing, he made his debut away to West Bromwich Albion, scoring the first goal and providing an assist for the second goal of a 3–2 win. On 19 December, Pedro scored the second goal in a 3–1 win against Sunderland, his first at Chelsea's home ground, Stamford Bridge. On 13 February, Pedro scored a brace in a 5–1 victory over Newcastle United, and again on 2 April in a 4–0 win over Aston Villa.

Pedro made his first start of the 2016–17 season on 20 August 2016 in an away match against Watford, after it was announced that Willian was out with an injury. On 23 October, Pedro scored the fastest goal of the season, which came in the first 30 seconds of a 4–0 home victory over Manchester United. He scored the equaliser for Chelsea shortly before half-time in a 2–1 victory over Tottenham Hotspur on 26 November. The goal was later named the Premier League Goal of the Month for November. On 30 April 2017, he scored with a 25 yard shot in a 3–0 away win over Chelsea Everton, which later won the Premier League Goal of the Month award for April.

2018–20: UEFA Europa League win and final season
On 11 August 2018, he scored his first league goal of the 2018–19 season in a 3–0 win away to Huddersfield Town. On his 150th Chelsea appearance, Pedro scored the club's 1,000th Premier League goal at Stamford Bridge, opening the scoring in a 2–0 win against Fulham. He scored two goals and had a hand in two more to help Chelsea through to the 2018–19 UEFA Europa League semi-final at the expense of Slavia Prague at Stamford Bridge on 18 April. Chelsea won 4–3 on the night and 5–3 on aggregate. On 29 May, Pedro scored in Chelsea's 4–1 win over Arsenal in the 2019 Europa League final; as a result, he became the fifth player to score in a European Cup/Champions League and UEFA Cup/Europa League final, after Allan Simonsen, Dmitri Alenichev, Hernán Crespo, and Steven Gerrard. His goal in the Europa League final meant that it was his ninth goal in a final in his career, putting him seventh in the all time list for top goal scorers in finals. He was included in the Europa League Team of the Season for the 2018–19 season.

Pedro scored his first league goal of the 2019–20 season on 8 March 2020 in a 4–0 home win over Everton. He had been scoreless in the Premier League for more than a year, with the previous goal dated back to 27 February 2019. On 26 July, Chelsea manager Frank Lampard confirmed that Pedro would leave the club at the end of the season.

Roma
On 25 August 2020, Serie A club Roma signed Pedro on a three-year contract. He made his debut on 19 September, in a 0–0 draw with Hellas Verona. He scored his first goal for Roma on 3 October in a 1–0 victory over Udinese. After a strong start, his performances worsened due to several injuries and a conflict with manager Paulo Fonseca. Nevertheless, he scored in a 2–0 win in the Derby della Capitale against Lazio in the final match of the season on 15 May 2021.

Lazio
On 19 August 2021, Pedro joined Roma's Derby della Capitale rivals Lazio on a two-year contract having been omitted from new Roma manager José Mourinho's squad for their pre-season fixtures. He became the first player since goalkeeper Astutillo Malgioglio in 1985 to move directly between the two clubs. On 21 August, he made his Lazio debut in a 3–1 win against Empoli. He scored his first goal for Lazio against Roma on 26 September, becoming only the third player to score for both clubs in the Derby della Capitale.

International career

Pedro was included by in Spain's 23-man squad for the 2010 FIFA World Cup in South Africa. Nine days later, he made his debut in a 3–2 friendly win against Saudi Arabia, replacing David Silva for the final 30 minutes. On 8 June, in the last friendly prior to the start of the World Cup, Pedro scored his first international goal, in a 6–0 victory over Poland in Murcia's Estadio Nueva Condomina.

Pedro appeared in five matches at the World Cup, three of which came as a late substitute. On 7 July 2010, in the semi-final against Germany, he started in place of Fernando Torres, who had been performing poorly in earlier matches. In the 82nd minute, with Spain leading 1–0, Pedro attempted to score a goal himself rather than set up an unmarked Torres, although he performed well in the match. Pedro started in the final at Soccer City in Johannesburg on 11 July, with Spain beating the Netherlands 1–0 after extra time to win the World Cup for the first time.

Pedro was part of the Spain squad for UEFA Euro 2012 in Poland and Ukraine, which they entered as defending champions. He did not appear in any of their matches in the group stage but came on as a substitute in each of their matches in the knockout stage. This included the final on 1 July, which he entered as a 59th-minute substitute as Spain beat Italy 4–0 at the Olympic Stadium in Kyiv.

Pedro scored the first hat-trick of his career on 12 October 2012 in a 4–0 away win over Belarus in a 2014 World Cup qualifier.

Style of play
A quick, versatile, and intelligent two-footed forward, Pedro usually plays as a left winger, although he is capable of playing on either flank, as well as in several other positions in both attack and midfield; he has often been used on the right flank with the Spanish national team. A nimble and diminutive player, he is known for his pace, balance, technique, dribbling skills, and defensive workrate, as well as his ability both to score and create goals, courtesy of his finishing ability, passing, crossing, and link-up play. Moreover, he is known for his ability to make runs in behind the opposing defence from the flank or drive forward, which makes him an attacking threat on counter-attacks.

Career statistics

Club

International

Scores and results list Spain's goal tally first, score column indicates score after each Pedro goal

Honours
Barcelona B
Tercera División: 2007–08

Barcelona
La Liga: 2008–09, 2009–10, 2010–11, 2012–13, 2014–15
Copa del Rey: 2008–09, 2011–12, 2014–15; runner-up: 2010–11, 2013–14
Supercopa de España: 2009, 2010, 2011, 2013
UEFA Champions League: 2008–09, 2010–11, 2014–15
UEFA Super Cup: 2009, 2011, 2015
FIFA Club World Cup: 2009, 2011

Chelsea
Premier League: 2016–17
FA Cup: 2017–18; runner-up: 2016–17, 2019–20
UEFA Europa League: 2018–19
EFL Cup runner-up: 2018–19

Spain
FIFA World Cup: 2010
UEFA European Championship: 2012
FIFA Confederations Cup runner-up: 2013

Individual
La Liga's Breakthrough Player: 2009–10
Premier League Goal of the Month: November 2016, April 2017
UEFA Europa League Squad of the Season: 2018–19

References

External links

1987 births
Living people
Footballers from Santa Cruz de Tenerife
Spanish footballers
Association football wingers
Association football forwards
FC Barcelona Atlètic players
FC Barcelona players
Chelsea F.C. players
A.S. Roma players
S.S. Lazio players
Tercera División players
Segunda División B players
La Liga players
Premier League players
Serie A players
FA Cup Final players
UEFA Champions League winning players
UEFA Europa League winning players
Spain under-21 international footballers
Spain international footballers
2010 FIFA World Cup players
UEFA Euro 2012 players
2013 FIFA Confederations Cup players
2014 FIFA World Cup players
UEFA Euro 2016 players
FIFA World Cup-winning players
UEFA European Championship-winning players
Spanish expatriate footballers
Expatriate footballers in England
Expatriate footballers in Italy
Spanish expatriate sportspeople in England
Spanish expatriate sportspeople in Italy